Outcome measures in rehabilitation medicine are tools used to evaluate the level of disability.  They can be beneficial for physicians to judge the path of a patient's recovery, for researchers to compare different management protocols and for politicians in order to find the cost-effectiveness of their decisions.

As an outcome measure specifically designed for spinal cord injury, the Spinal Cord Independence Measure is a tool that evaluates how safely, cheaply, and independently a patient can do basic activities of daily living.


Structure
The measure consists of 19 items categorized in three subscales:self care, respiration and sphincter management, and mobility.

Psychometric property
Its last version, SCIM III has been validated in many multicenter trials and translated into Italian, Spanish, Greek, Portuguese, Thai, Turkish and Persian languages. It has been concluded that SCIM III has the most appropriate psychometric properties for measuring functional level of spinal cord injured individuals.

References 

Disability
Spinal cord disorders